The 2018 World Series of Poker Europe (WSOPE) took place from October 9-November 2 at King's Casino in Rozvadov, Czech Republic. There were 10 bracelet events, including a €100,000 No Limit Hold'em High Roller and the €10,350 No Limit Hold'em Main Event. The Main Event began with the first of two starting flights on October 27, with the final table taking place on November 2.

Event schedule
Source:

Player of the Year
Final standings as of November 2 (end of WSOPE):

Main Event
The 2018 World Series of Poker Europe Main Event began on October 27 with the first of two starting flights. The final table was reached on November 1, with the winner being determined on November 2. The event drew 534 entrants, generating a prize pool of €5,073,000. The top 81 players finished in the money, with the winner earning €1,122,239.

Final Table

*-Career statistics prior to the beginning of the 2018 WSOPE Main Event

Final Table results

References

World Series of Poker Europe
2018 in poker